José Jhonson (3 September 1939 – 22 December 2015) was an Ecuadorian footballer. He played in five matches for the Ecuador national football team in 1963. He was also part of Ecuador's squad for the 1963 South American Championship.

References

1939 births
2015 deaths
Ecuadorian footballers
Ecuador international footballers
Association football defenders
Sportspeople from Guayaquil